The Roman Catholic Diocese of Mutare is a suffragan diocese in eastern Zimbabwe. It includes the city of Mutare and is part of the ecclesiastical province of Harare.

History
 February 2, 1953: Established as Apostolic Prefecture of Umtali from the Apostolic Vicariate of Fort Victoria and Apostolic Vicariate of Salisbury
 February 15, 1957: Promoted as Diocese of Umtali
 June 25, 1982: Renamed as Diocese of Mutare

Bishops

Prefect Apostolic of Umtali 
 Donal Lamont, OCarm (6 February 1953 – 15 February 1957)

Bishops of Umtali 
 Donal Lamont, OCarm (15 February 1957 – 5 November 1981)
 Alexio Churu Muchabaiwa (5 November 1981 – 25 June 1982)

Bishops of Mutare 
 Alexio Churu Muchabaiwa (25 June 1982 – 27 August 2016)
 Paul Horan, OCarm (27 August 2016 – )

Auxiliary bishop 
 Patrick Mumbure Mutume (17 June 1979 – 8 February 2017)

See also
Catholic Church in Zimbabwe
List of Catholic dioceses in Zimbabwe

Notes

References
 GCatholic.org

External links

 

Roman Catholic dioceses in Zimbabwe
Christian organizations established in 1953
Roman Catholic dioceses and prelatures established in the 20th century
Roman Catholic Ecclesiastical Province of Harare